Trim Aerodrome is located  north-east of Trim, a town in County Meath, Ireland.

Trim Flying Club, a Registered Training Facility (RTF), is based at the aerodrome and operates two aircraft. The airfield is also home to other general aviation aircraft including microlights.

References

Airports in the Republic of Ireland
Transport in County Meath